International Cycle Sport was a British cycling magazine that covered British and European road racing. It had 199 issues between May 1968 and December 1984.

History
International Cycle Sport was the idea of Kennedy Brothers Publishing, a printing company in Keighley, Yorkshire, owned by three brothers. With help from cycle parts importer and advertiser Ron Kitching, they brought in Jock Wadley as editor, who was head of the newly defunct Sporting Cyclist.

By 1972, the magazine was selling around the world, with a special issue for the United States that had different centre pages for local stories.

See also
 Cycling Weekly
 VeloNews
 Winning Bicycle Racing Illustrated

References

1968 establishments in the United Kingdom
1984 disestablishments in the United Kingdom
Cycling magazines published in the United Kingdom
Defunct magazines published in the United Kingdom
English-language magazines
Magazines established in 1968
Magazines disestablished in 1984
Monthly magazines published in the United Kingdom
Mass media in Yorkshire